"A World Without Love" is a song recorded by the British duo Peter and Gordon and released as their first single in February 1964. It was included on the duo's debut album in the UK, and in the US on an album of the same name. The song was written by Paul McCartney and attributed to Lennon–McCartney. The B-side was "If I Were You", written by Peter and Gordon.

In the United Kingdom, the song reached No. 1 on both the Record Retailer chart and the New Musical Express chart. In the United States, "A World Without Love" topped both the Billboard Hot 100 and the Cash Box Top 100. The song also reached No. 1 on the Irish Singles Chart, No. 1 on New Zealand's "Lever Hit Parade", No. 2 in Australia, and No. 8 on Norway's VG-lista.

Background
McCartney wrote the song when he was 16. When he moved into the London home of his then-girlfriend Jane Asher in 1963, sharing a room with her brother Peter Asher, who asked McCartney if he could use the song after he and Gordon Waller had signed a recording contract as Peter and Gordon. McCartney described John Lennon's reaction to the song: "The funny first line always used to please John. 'Please lock me away –' 'Yes, okay.' End of song." Lennon said of the song that "I think that was resurrected from the past. ... I think he had that whole song before the Beatles. ... That has the line 'Please lock me away' that we always used to crack up at."

McCartney did not think the song was good enough for The Beatles. As such, the song was never released by the Beatles, and the only known recording of the song by any member of the Beatles is the original demo of the song performed by McCartney, which is now in the possession of Peter Asher. In January 2013, Paul McCartney's demo was posted to YouTube. The clip was played at Asher's most recent string of concerts.

It is one of two songs credited to Lennon–McCartney to reach number one in the US by an artist other than the Beatles. The other is "Lucy in the Sky with Diamonds" (which was recorded by the Beatles but not released as a single), covered by Elton John in 1974. "Bad to Me", written by Lennon and McCartney in 1963, was given to Billy J. Kramer and reached number 1 in the UK, but it failed to do so in the US. Before giving the song to Peter and Gordon, McCartney offered "A World Without Love" to Kramer, who rejected it. The song was one of the seven number ones credited to Lennon-McCartney that charted in the US in 1964, an all-time songwriting record for most songs to top the US charts in a calendar year.

Cash Box described it as "a tantalizing, easy-beat thumper."

The lead guitarist on this recording is studio musician Vic Flick who also played the guitar lick for the James Bond Theme. "A World Without Love" is one of The Rock and Roll Hall of Fame's 500 Songs that Shaped Rock and Roll.

Chart history

Weekly charts

Year-end charts

Bobby Rydell version
A cover version by Bobby Rydell released May 1964 was a strong regional hit in many markets.  It reached No. 80 on the U.S. Billboard Hot 100 and No. 2 in a tandem ranking with the Peter and Gordon version on the Cash Box Top 100, before Rydell's name was dropped from the entry. In Canada, Rydell's version reached No. 9 co-charting with the Peter and Gordon version.

In his native Philadelphia the paired versions reached No. 1, while in the Pittsburgh market Rydell's version reached No. 4 to the exclusion of the Peter and Gordon original. In Chicago, Rydell's version reached No. 10 on the WLS "Silver Dollar Survey", in a tandem ranking with the Peter and Gordon version, while reaching No. 13 independently. Rydell's version also reached No. 5 in Singapore and No. 9 in Hong Kong.

Other versions
In 1964, The Supremes released a version of the song on the album A Bit of Liverpool. Their version was a hit in some countries in Southeast Asia, reaching No. 7 in Malaysia.  Del Shannon recorded a cover on his 1964 album Handy Man. Patty Duke recorded a version on her 1965 debut album Don't Just Stand There. Terry Black released a version of the song on his 1965 debut album, Only 16. The Mavericks released a version of the song on their 1999 compilation album Super Colossal Smash Hits of the 90's: The Best of The Mavericks.

Notes

References

External links
World Without Love at JPGR.org
 

1964 songs
1964 debut singles
Songs written by Lennon–McCartney
The Beatles songs
Peter and Gordon songs
Terry Black songs
UK Singles Chart number-one singles
RPM Top Singles number-one singles
Irish Singles Chart number-one singles
Number-one singles in New Zealand
Billboard Hot 100 number-one singles
Cashbox number-one singles
Capitol Records singles
Columbia Graphophone Company singles